Platanthera nivea, commonly called the snowy orchid, is an orchid species of  native to the Southeastern United States. Its range is almost entirely restricted to the southeastern Coastal Plain, with a few notable inland populations such as in Coffee County, Tennessee. Within this range, it is found in wet savannas and bogs.

Platanthera nivea has a highly irregular flowering pattern, with whole populations not flowering for a number of years. Populations of this orchid have declined considerably over the 20th century due to habitat destruction.

References 

nivea
Orchids of the United States